The 2009 Indian general election in Uttarakhand, occurred for 5 seats in the state. All 5 seats were won by the Indian National Congress.

Elected MPs
Following is the list of elected MPs from Uttarakhand.

By-election
By-elections were held in 2012 for Tehri Garhwal constituency as Elected MP Vijay Bahuguna became the Chief Minister of Uttarakhand.

In the election, Bharatiya Janata Party candidate Mala Rajya Laxmi Shah defeated Saket Bahuguna, son of Vijay Bahuguna by margin of over 22,000.

See also 

 Elections in Uttarakhand
 Politics of Uttarakhand
 2009 Indian general election
 15th Lok Sabha
 List of members of the 15th Lok Sabha

References

Uttarakhand
Indian general elections in Uttarakhand